The Parit Buntar railway station is a Malaysian train station located at and named after the town of Parit Buntar, Perak.

External links
 Parit Buntar Railway Station

Kerian District
KTM ETS railway stations
Railway stations in Perak